Baghra Assembly constituency was one of the 403 constituencies of the Uttar Pradesh Legislative Assembly, India. It was a part of the Muzaffarnagar district and one of five assembly constituencies in the Kairana (Lok Sabha constituency).

Baghra Assembly constituency was demolished in 2008 as a result of the "Delimitation of Parliamentary and Assembly Constituencies Order, 2008".

Members of the Legislative Assembly

See also

Baghra
Government of Uttar Pradesh
List of Vidhan Sabha constituencies of Uttar Pradesh
Uttar Pradesh
Uttar Pradesh Legislative Assembly

References 

Former assembly constituencies of Uttar Pradesh
Politics of Muzaffarnagar district
Constituencies disestablished in 2008
2008 disestablishments in India